The 1978–79 Roller Hockey Champions Cup was the 14th edition of the Roller Hockey Champions Cup organized by CERH.

Barcelona achieved their fourth title.

Teams
The champions of the main European leagues, and Barcelona as title holders, played this competition, consisting in a double-legged knockout tournament. As Barcelona qualified also as Spanish champion, Reus Deportiu joined also the competition.

Bracket

Source:

References

External links
 CERH website

1978 in roller hockey
1979 in roller hockey
Rink Hockey Euroleague